Harariz (also Romanized as Harārīz; also known as Harāyrez) is a village in Bakesh-e Yek Rural District, in the Central District of Mamasani County, Fars Province, Iran. At the 2006 census, its population was 24, in 6 families.

In the year 1395, the harayraz Monograph Book was published by Sasan Moaddab of the Hararez Youth and in collaboration with Dr. Suleiman Heidari, a professor at Shiraz University. This book examines the history, natural and human geography of the region and the customs of the people of Guinea.

References 

Populated places in Mamasani County